Russkoye Radio (in English: Russian Radio) is a  Russian radio station, broadcasting in some CIS countries. It differs from other similar stations since it broadcasts songs almost exclusively in Russian.

In Moscow broadcast "Russian Radio" began on August 2, 1995.

In 1996 at the "Russian Radio" established folk music award "Golden Gramophone", which takes place at the end of each year in the Kremlin in Moscow and a similar ceremony takes place at the Ice Palace in St. Petersburg. In 2006 came the TV equivalent of the "Russian Radio" - TV RU.TV.

Also, Russkoye Radio was broadcast in Ukraine from 2001 to 2022 under the name Russkoye Radio Ukraina. In February 2022, Russkoye Radio Ukraina stopped broadcasting due to the Russian invasion of Ukraine and was replaced with Radio Bayraktar.

References

External links
 Русское радио Россия

International radio networks
Radio stations in Russia
Russian-language radio stations
Russian language
Mass media in Moscow